Menmecho Lake is a mountain lake located in Gangtok district in the state of Sikkim, India. It lies on the way to the Jelep Pass and is situated at a distance of  ahead of the Lake Tsomgo. It is the source of the river Rangpo chu, a tributary of the Teesta River. The waters of the lake are sourced by melting snow in summer, and the monsoon in the wet season.

The lake is noted for its trout, and has a large fish farm nearby with a guesthouse. Menmecho is closed to tourists.

Gallery

Menmecho, Lake